The fourth presidential election of Nepal, to elect the country's third president since the abolition of the monarchy, was held on 9 March 2023.

The term of the incumbent president, Bidya Devi Bhandari, first elected in 2015, was set to expire on 13 March 2023. She was term-limited and could not seek re-election, with the Constitution of Nepal barring her from doing so.

Electoral process 
The President of Nepal is elected by the majority of the votes of all members of the electoral colleges. If no candidate is elected, a second round is held between the top two candidates of the first round, under the same majority. As the latter is of the total votes including blank and invalid ones as well as abstentions, it is possible no candidate is elected in the first and second rounds. A third may then be held with the same candidates as in the second. The candidate with the majority of valid votes is then elected president.

Part 6, Article 64 of the Constitution of Nepal 2015 sets the following qualifications for holding the presidency:
 A person shall be eligible to be president if he/she fulfils the following qualifications:
 He/she is eligible to be a member of the Federal Parliament.
 He/she has attained at least 45 years of age, and
 Is not ineligible by any law.
 Notwithstanding anything contained in clause (1), a person who has already been elected president for two terms, shall not be eligible to be a presidential candidate for the presidential election thereafter.

Election schedule 
The Election Commission announced the schedule for the presidential elections on 30 January 2023.

Electoral college 
The electoral college is composed in 2023 of 881 members, of which 331 are from the federal parliament and 550 from the provincial assemblies, with a vote "weight" of 79 and 48 each, respectively. While the federal parliament is made of 275 members from the lower house and 59 from the upper one, 2 members of the lower house were unable to be registered in the electoral college because of a judicial affair and a third one died, thus lowering the electoral college total from the normal number of 884 to 881, and the grand total of weighted votes from 52,786 to 52,549.

Electoral college composition

Electoral college vote value composition

Candidates 
On 24 February 2023, Ram Chandra Paudel of the Nepali Congress was chosen as the common candidate of an alliance of eight political parties; Congress, CPN (Maoist Centre), CPN (Unified Socialist), PSPN, Janamat, LSPN, NUP and RJM. The next day, the CPN (UML) announced that it would field party vice-chair Subas Chandra Nemwang as its presidential candidate.

Nepali Congress

Communist Party of Nepal (Unified Marxist–Leninist)

Results

See also 
 2023 Nepalese vice presidential election

Notes

References 

Presidential elections in Nepal
2023 elections in Nepal